The Norwegian Association of the Disabled (NHF) is an interest organization for disabled people in Norway. The organization has eleven suborganizations for people with specific disabilities, a youth branch, nine regional and three hundred local groups. The goal is full equality and participation in society for people with reduced mobility.

References

Disability organisations based in Norway
Human rights organisations based in Norway
Disability rights organizations